Aslan Alanovich Lappinagov (born 9 August 1993) is a Russian judoka. He is the 2017 European bronze medalist in the 81 kg division.

References

External links
 
 
 

1993 births
Russian male judoka
Living people
Universiade medalists in judo
Universiade silver medalists for Russia
Medalists at the 2017 Summer Universiade
20th-century Russian people
21st-century Russian people